Lome may refer to:

Places
 Lomé, the capital and largest city of Togo
 Lome (woreda), a woreda in the Oromia Region of Ethiopia
 Lome, Slovenia, a dispersed settlement in the Municipality of Idrija in the Inner Carniola region

Other uses
 Lomé Convention, a trade and aid agreement between the EU the ACP
 Lomé Peace Accord, a Sierra Leone peace agreement
 LOME, Late Ordovician mass extinction

People with the name
 Enrique Dupuy de Lôme, Spanish ambassador to the United States
 Henri Dupuy de Lôme (died 1885), French naval architect 
 Lome Fa'atau (born 1975), New Zealand rugby union player

See also
 French ship Dupuy de Lôme, a list of ships